Lago La Plata is a lake located between the municipalities of Naranjito, Toa Alta, and Bayamón in Puerto Rico. The lake was created in 1973 and serves as a reservoir for potable water.

The lake receives flow from the La Plata River and can be used for fishing.

See also
 Rivers of Puerto Rico

References

External links
Proyecto Salon Hogar

Lakes of Puerto Rico